Henry "Hank" Henshaw is a supervillain appearing in American comic books published by DC Comics, and normally goes by the name Cyborg Superman. Created by writer-artist Dan Jurgens, the character originally appeared primarily as an enemy of Superman, however in recent years he has also been an enemy of the Green Lantern Corps.

At times, he is also referred to as The Cyborg (not to be confused with Victor Stone a.k.a. Cyborg)

In 2011, IGN ranked him #33 of the "Top 100 Comic Book Villains".

Publication history
While the character debuted in The Adventures of Superman #465 (May 1990) and was created by Dan Jurgens, he was reintroduced as the original Cyborg Superman during the Reign of the Supermen storyline following Superman's death.

Fictional character biography

Hank Henshaw first appeared as a crew member on board the doomed NASA Space Shuttle Excalibur in Superman (vol. 2) #42, and Henshaw and the other crew members were next seen in The Adventures of Superman #465.

Hank and the other three members of the Excalibur crew, including his wife Terri, are part of a radiation experiment designed by LexCorp that is affected by a solar flare, causing their shuttle to crash. As a result of their radiation exposure, the human bodies of two crew members were destroyed. However, their minds survived and they were able to construct new bodies out of cosmic radiation and bits of earth and wreckage from the shuttle, respectively. Initially, Henshaw and his wife suffer no ill effects from the radiation (though Hank's hair turns white), and the crew travels to Metropolis in the hopes of using LexCorp facilities to cure their mutated crewmates. During a brief battle with Superman, one crew member, now composed of radiation, becomes unhinged and flies into the Sun, destroying himself. By this time, Henshaw's body has started to rapidly decay, while his wife is beginning to phase into an alternate dimension. With Superman's help, Henshaw is able to use the LexCorp facilities to save Terri. The remaining member of the shuttle crew commits suicide, using an MRI booth to tear apart the metallic components of his body.

Though Henshaw's physical body expired, he was able to transfer his consciousness into the LexCorp mainframe. Now able to control technology, Henshaw appears to his wife in a robotic body. The shock of this bizarre rebirth is too much for Terri to bear and in a fit of insanity, she jumps to her death. By this point, Henshaw's electronic consciousness has begun to disrupt Earth's communications networks. Using NASA communications equipment, Henshaw beams his mind into the birthing matrix which had carried Superman from Krypton to Earth as an infant. He creates a small exploration craft from the birthing matrix and departs into outer space alone.

Henshaw spends some time traveling between planets, bonding with local lifeforms to learn about the culture and history of various worlds. Henshaw comes to believe that Superman was responsible for the tragedy of the Excalibur after learning that around the time of the accident, the Man of Steel had thrown a rogue Kryptonian artificial intelligence (the Eradicator) into the Sun. Henshaw believes that this created the solar flare that resulted in the Excalibur crew's transformations (although Superman had shared this concern with Terri after he had saved her life and she had confirmed that the flares would have been triggered before Superman disposed of the Eradicator). Over time, Henshaw becomes delusional and paranoid, believing that the Man of Steel had intentionally caused the deaths of himself, his wife, and his crew, then driven him from Earth. Arriving on a planet controlled by alien overlord and Superman foe Mongul, Henshaw learns of Warworld and forcibly recruits Mongul as part of a plan for revenge against Superman.

Reign of the Supermen

With Superman apparently dead after his battle with Doomsday, Henshaw decides to pose as him to destroy his reputation. To that end, the Cyborg claims to be Superman reborn, the result of his body being pieced together and revived with technology. The Cyborg then uses knowledge obtained from Superman's birthing matrix to construct a body that is genetically identical to Superman's. When analyzed closely by Professor Hamilton, the Cyborg passes for the real thing, due to components within himself that include Kryptonian alloys, combined with the fact that the replaced body parts correspond with those parts of the original Superman's body that were most severely injured in his fight with Doomsday.

After destroying a Superman memorial plaque in front of the Daily Planet, the Cyborg exiles Doomsday into space, prevents a nuclear meltdown, and saves the President of the United States from an assassination attempt. The White House then endorses the Cyborg as the 'true' Superman. When confronted by Lois Lane, the Cyborg claims his memory is "blurry", but he can see a "spaceship on a farm and the name Kent", suggesting that Henshaw may be aware of Superman's secret identity.

Henshaw's arrival as Superman is simultaneous with that of three others: John Henry Irons (the self-styled Man of Steel), the Eradicator (the self-styled Last Son of Krypton), and the modern Superboy. The endorsement of the President ensures that the Cyborg eclipses the rest of the heroes claiming to be Superman's heir. During this time, two cults spring up in anticipation of Superman's return from the dead: one that deifies the Eradicator and another that venerates the Cyborg. Supporters of both eventually come to blows over which is the real Superman.

Destroying Coast City
When an alien ship appears over Coast City, the Cyborg attacks and severely injures the Eradicator, allowing Mongul's craft to destroy the city. The Cyborg also murders an entire family of vacationers trying to find a way out of the devastated area. The Cyborg was then able to convince the White House and the public that the Eradicator was responsible. After tricking and defeating Superboy, Henshaw prepares to launch a nuclear warhead intended to convert Metropolis into a second Engine City.

Superboy is able to escape and warn John Henry Irons, Supergirl, and the resurrected (but powerless) original Superman of the Cyborg's plans. The quartet travels to the site of the former Coast City, and Superman (whose powers are slowly returning), Supergirl, and Steel confront Mongul and the Cyborg, while Superboy stops the missile from hitting Metropolis. While Green Lantern defeats Mongul, the Cyborg lures Superman and the Eradicator to the Engine City main reactor and attempts to kill Superman with the kryptonite that powers the engine. When Henshaw tries to kill Superman with a concentrated blast of kryptonite radiation, the Eradicator intercepts the blast at the expense of his own life. As the kryptonite energy passes through the Eradicator, the radiation is altered and acts to fully restore Superman's powers. Superman is then able to easily defeat the already weakened Cyborg by sticking his arm through Henshaw's chest, killing him and shattering his body. When Henshaw panics and states that he will "somehow" find a way to come back, a doubting Superman simply says that if Henshaw does, he will be waiting.

It was later revealed that Henshaw chose to attack Coast City first because he and his late wife were former residents. This was part of an effort to erase his former life.

Return

Before exiling Doomsday into space, Henshaw had installed a device on the monster to allow him to detect if Doomsday were to ever escape. After the destruction of his Cyborg Superman form, Henshaw transfers his consciousness into this device as Doomsday is "the safest place in the galaxy" for the Cyborg to hide. Doomsday is brought on board a space cruiser and, despite frantic efforts of the crew to jettison him, kills the crew, and upon landing on Apokolips, proceeds to pillage the planet.
 
When Superman, his power now boosted by being repowered by "purple kryptonite", arrives, Henshaw emerges by reconfiguring an armored Apokoliptian trooper, brutally murdered by Doomsday, into a new body (which, by all accounts, had its DNA overwritten with the Kryptonian DNA Henshaw had obtained while in Superman's birthing matrix, and thus still retains a portion of Superman's abilities and still looks the way the Cyborg Superman looked, except for a change in the color of the Cyborg's metallic components) and proceeds to lay siege to the planet alongside Doomsday. The Cyborg successfully takes over most of Apokolips but is captured by Darkseid's Omega Beams during a battle with Superman.

Apokolips and beyond
Darkseid did not kill the Cyborg; rather, the Omega Effect captured Henshaw in a small orb, with Darkseid planning to use the Cyborg against Superman at a later date. Darkseid eventually frees Henshaw with the understanding that Henshaw is to leave Apokolips and never return.

The Cyborg eventually aligns himself with an intergalactic Tribunal which is seeking to bring Superman to trial for the crimes of his ancestors. Henshaw assists the Tribunal in capturing the Eradicator, Superboy, Supergirl, Steel, and Alpha Centurion, who had intended to rescue Superman. However, the Cyborg betrayed the Tribunal and attempted to conquer their planet for conversion into a new Warworld. Superman and his allies stop the Cyborg's plan and, when Henshaw's involvement in the destruction of Coast City is brought to the attention of the Tribunal, they find him guilty of genocide and sentence him to death. As an electronic consciousness, Henshaw cannot be killed by normal means and is transported beyond the event horizon of a black hole, where not even light can escape from the gravity.

Rather than being destroyed, the Cyborg is transported (unknowingly by another villain, Thanos) to a Marvel Multiverse dimension designated as 616, as seen at the beginning of the Green Lantern/Silver Surfer: Unholy Alliances crossover one-shot issue. The Cyborg destroys a planet in another attempt to recreate Warworld, attracting the attention of the Silver Surfer. Their short battle is interrupted by the arrival of Parallax, who has been tracking the Cyborg for some time, seeking vengeance for the destruction of Coast City. In the confusion, Henshaw escapes and is returned to the DC Universe. Parallax undoes the destruction of the planet that Henshaw had caused using power donated from the Silver Surfer.

The Cyborg encounters Hal Jordan again at the Source Wall, a nexus of statues that channels vital energy to preserve the Fourth World. Parallax uses his powers to generate representations of the victims of Coast City, which tear the Cyborg's body apart. Jordan then disperses Henshaw's consciousness, and the Cyborg is seemingly destroyed once again.

During a crisis involving the Godwave, Superman (wearing his blue energy costume at the time) travels to New Genesis and encounters Henshaw again. Henshaw has taken part of the Source Wall's structure and crafted a small world made up of his memories, which he uses to taunt Superman before being defeated again. Unknown to Superman, the Cyborg stored his own consciousness in Superman's high-tech containment suit. After Superman returns to Earth, Henshaw escapes and constructs a new body, this time posing as an art teacher at a high school in an attempt to start over. He is a popular teacher and befriends the blind Ashbury Armstrong (daughter of Dirk Armstrong), but ultimately his rage towards Superman causes him to reveal his true identity and his new body is lost in a fight with Superman. To escape detection, Henshaw stores his consciousness in a clay statue. This statue is later stolen by the Toyman and the two villains join forces to kill Superman. To this end, the Cyborg designs a machine that will break Superman's energy form down into multiple components and beam them to different points in the galaxy, preventing Superman from reforming. A malfunction in the machine causes Superman to split into Superman Blue and Superman Red, the latter of whom eventually defeats and recaptures the Cyborg.

The Cyborg later attempts to take over Kandor, but fails when he is defeated by Superman and sent to the Phantom Zone. Shortly after the Superman Y2K story, Henshaw escapes the Zone and attacks Superman, who was suffering from Kryptonite poisoning. Henshaw is defeated with the help of the Kandorians and sent back to the Phantom Zone, swearing revenge, but he is not encountered on subsequent visits to the Zone.

Manhunters
Henshaw returns in a form similar to his original body, when he is revealed to be the Manhunters' new Grandmaster. With his influence, the Manhunters have been upgraded with organic material, most notably with blood. On the Manhunter home world of Biot, in sector 3601, Henshaw is holding captive several assumed-to-be-dead Green Lanterns, most of whom appeared to die during the Emerald Twilight saga.

Henshaw has also used Kryptonian technology to upgrade the Manhunters. During the Green Lantern story arc No Fear, Kryptonian robots are seen servicing the Manhunters. Henshaw, the Grandmaster, allowed the Green Lantern Corps to rebuild for unspecified reasons as a part of his master plan. While Henshaw explains that he first encountered the Manhunters around the time he was imprisoned in the Source Wall by Parallax, it has yet to be revealed how the Cyborg was able to escape the Phantom Zone and take control of Biot. Henshaw is defeated when Biot explodes, destroying most of his body aside from his head.

Henshaw's head is then brought by a Guardian back to Oa so that they can learn of how he was able to take control of Biot, what he has learned from the Manhunters and to learn about "the 52" (referring to the 51 alternate Earths created during the second Crisis as well as their own reality). It is also revealed that the Cyborg knows of the 52, though exactly how he came by this knowledge is not made completely clear. It is stated that he has explored "The Bleed"; the space between dimensions, which could have occurred either when he was imprisoned there, when he was imprisoned in the Source Wall, or in his past exploration of the Marvel Universe.

Sinestro Corps

Henshaw's head is taken by the Sinestro Corps after their invasion of Oa to Qward. Henshaw is later seen as a herald of the newly returned Anti-Monitor. He reconstructs his cyborg body and replaces the S-symbol on his chest with the symbol of the Sinestro Corps. He now wields ten Qwardian power rings. It is revealed that Henshaw has joined the Sinestro Corps so that the Anti-Monitor can later kill him and allow him to rest in peace.

Henshaw was the focus of the Tales of the Sinestro Corps Presents: Cyborg Superman one-shot that was released on October 3, 2007. In this book, Henshaw and his Manhunters head to Earth to assist the Sinestro Corps in their attack. En route, Henshaw stops leading the Manhunters which continue to their preprogrammed destinations. As he watches them go, he remembers everything that has happened to him, from their dreadful shuttle accident to his wife's suicide when she sees him in his robot form. He finishes this journey down memory lane by going to his wife's grave. He digs her corpse out and rips it into two, shouting that all he wants is not to be with her, but for these memories to fade.

Meanwhile, the Manhunters begin an assault on the JLA satellite. Hawkgirl, Black Lightning, and Red Arrow retaliate; however, all three are neutralized when Henshaw assists in the attack and he successfully tampers with the mechanics of the satellite core. As the satellite is thrown out of orbit, Superman appears and engages Henshaw in battle. Their fight continues on Earth, while Sinestro transports his crew and his ship from the anti-matter universe. At first Superman seems to have the upper hand; however after two punches, Henshaw strikes with great power and rage, punching him through the Statue of Liberty. By the end, Henshaw has Superman in a choke hold, thinking that the victory is near.

He is later seen briefly in Tales of the Sinestro Corps Presents: Superman-Prime, having presumably been beaten back by the combined strength of Superman, Supergirl, and Power Girl.

When the Green Lantern Corps decide to detonate New Warworld and the central power battery of the Sinestro Corps to destroy the Anti-Monitor, Henshaw allows himself to be trapped behind a shield and exposed to the massive explosion. Before he is destroyed, however, he thanks the Green Lantern Corps.

Most of Henshaw's body survived the explosion, but it took further damage when Superman-Prime hurled the Anti-Monitor into space. The upper part of his skull was retrieved by the android Manhunters. Unable to detect any life signs and confused without his leadership, the Manhunters reanimated the brain of the Cyborg Superman. He shed a tear when he realized he was still alive.

Death and retrieval
In the Brightest Day crossover, Henshaw would eventually return and work with the Alpha Lanterns as they attempted to augment every Green Lantern, including Ganthet, into an Alpha. This was apparently at the suggestion of the robed figure holding Ion and Parallax, who told him that Ganthet held the knowledge to destroy him permanently, after Henshaw's attempts to provoke Nekron into killing him during the Blackest Night failed because he lacked a heart to attract Nekron's interest. By threatening to make the Alpha Lanterns kill themselves if Ganthet does not cooperate, Henshaw forces Ganthet to work on reversing the augments that turned the Green Lanterns into Alpha Lanterns, hoping that he can use the resulting information to restore his original mortal body.

Henshaw is seemingly killed when his lifeforce was finally separated from his nearly indestructible body by the combined full powered blasts of several Lanterns and Ganthet, and appeared on the mental plane of Alpha-Lantern Boodikka in an attempt to take her bio-mechanical body over, where both beings were their original, un-powered selves. Her essence, gifted with her innate, formidable combat skills, engaged his in one-on-one combat, and she quickly overpowered and killed his astral form.

Afterwards, however, Ganthet noted immediately that there was something different about her. Boodikka claims this is because Ganthet's newly discovered emotions allowed him to see her as she is (Boodikka's true self, now in control of her body again), not by what she is (an Alpha Lantern).

In the Reign of Doomsday crossover, Boodikka is attacked by Doomsday while investigating the remains of New Krypton, and Henshaw is revealed to still be alive inside her, forming a new body out of her internal circuitry to fight Doomsday while Batman and Supergirl were trying to repair Boodikka. Henshaw uses his abilities to take control of the JLA Watchtower and uses the satellite's defenses in an attempt to kill Doomsday, reasoning that if he could manage to destroy the creature that killed Superman, it would prove once and for all that he is superior to Superman. After the creature is violently dismembered by Henshaw, it somehow absorbs the nanotechnology from Henshaw's body and repairs itself, becoming a new being dubbed Cyborg Doomsday. Cyborg Doomsday somehow manages to negate Henshaw's ability to repair himself, which leads Henshaw to believe that he might finally meet his demise. Supergirl bursts onto the scene and attempts to stop Doomsday herself, but Henshaw fires an energy blast at her, stating that he would not allow her to defeat the creature that had humiliatingly beaten him only moments before. With Supergirl distracted, Cyborg Doomsday knocks her out and then tears one of Henshaw's arms off before departing with both of his unconscious captives. Trapped in a satellite with the other Supermen, the heroes conclude that Henshaw has been trapped with them to keep them disorganized due to the tensions caused by his presence, prompting Henshaw to depart and search the satellite himself. After Superman arrives to rescue his comrades, Henshaw reveals that the Doomsdays that fought them were actually all clones of the original created by Lex Luthor. Henshaw tries to fight them, but Superman rips his central node off, knowing that they would not survive a confrontation with the Doomsdays. After the Doomsday clones are sent to another dimension, Henshaw is in custody of S.T.A.R. Labs.

The New 52 and DC Rebirth 
In September 2011, The New 52 rebooted DC's continuity. A fully human Henshaw appears as a doctor working for the Advanced Prosthetic Research Centre and colleague of Caitlin Fairchild. He is tasked into reactivating the android Spartan.

While in space and after saving a planet called I'noxia, Supergirl discovers an amnesiac Cyborg Superman living there. This version is revealed to be Zor-El, who survives Krypton's destruction and is reconfigured as a half-human half-machine by Brainiac to be his scout looking for stronger species in the universe. His heart was switched with that of a human to remove his ability to be affected by kryptonite.

When the human Henshaw is sent into space on the Excalibur on a long-term mission, he is monitored by the Clark Kent and Lois Lane of the pre-Flashpoint universe, who were trapped in the New 52 world following the Convergence, with Superman seeking to prevent the rise of some of his former adversaries in this world. When the Excalibur crashes after returning from a ten-year journey to Jupiter and back, Superman saves the ship, but is puzzled to see that Henshaw is the only person on board. Taking Henshaw to a base he has established in the Arctic regions to better assess if this Henshaw is a threat or not, Superman is briefly forced to face both Henshaw and a new foe called Blanque, who possesses powerful telepathic and telekinetic abilities and was also kept in the fortress, but once Blanque is focused on fighting Superman, Henshaw helps Superman defeat this new foe with the weapons of a spaceship that was also kept in the fortress. It is later revealed that Henshaw acquired part of an object known as 'the Oblivion Stone' on Jupiter, with Superman forced to face an alien warrior seeking both Henshaw's part of the stone and another part kept in the fortress, but Superman drives her off, Henshaw claiming when questioned that he had no memory of anything that happened on the Excalibur or between it landing and him being discovered.

After the reality disruption caused by Mister Mxyzptlk caused the histories of the pre-Flashpoint and New 52 Superman to merge during the DC Rebirth reboot, Henshaw's memories of his past as the Cyborg Superman were restored. With this knowledge, he assembles various old foes of Superman like Metallo, the Eradicator, Blanque, and his old 'ally' Mongul to form the Superman Revenge Squad before using the Oblivion Stone to restore his body to its Cyborg Superman state. He even expressed interest into recruiting General Zod to his group. The new Superman Revenge Squad then set out for Kal-El's Fortress of Solitude to obtain the Phantom Zone Projector, still in need of Zod's Kryptonian army to defeat the Superman family. What the Cyborg did not realize was that Zod was using the Squad to achieve his own ends. After finding his family trapped within the Zone's confines, Zod betrayed them, leaving Henshaw trapped within the Phantom Zone.

He is later released by his hated enemy, Superman, on account of an epiphany Clark had while on a time traveling excursion with Booster Gold. To keep the maddened bionic menace docile while he came up with a more humane means of detaining him, Superman gives Henshaw a Kryptonian memory crystal that would pacify the Cyborg Superman's rage by letting him relive his happiest memories in an fantasy world fabricated by his own mind. This self-imposed incarceration would not last, however, as the demented machine man finds another means of escape. While he is trapped, a part of his mind escapes into the universe, where he sought to manipulate the Guardians and their appointed intergalactic law enforcement bureau, the Green Lantern Corps, to facilitate his escape.

Even trapped within Superman's Kryptonian dwelling, Henshaw is able to influence the Central Power Battery back on Oa a universe away. From within his cell, he orchestrates a mystery surrounding the death of a Guardian to find a powerful weapon, the Phantom Ring. After hacking into the Lantern ring network, Henshaw uses the unsuspecting Corpsmen Simon Baz, to break the Cyborg out of the Fortress of Solitude and deliver him the Phantom Ring. Henshaw is able to capture the Green Lanterns as his hacking into their main central Power Battery rendered their rings useless. John Stewart and Simon Baz use the Kryptonian weapons that Simon borrowed from the Fortress, along with the fact that any Green Lantern who had not recharged their rings prior to Henshaw hacking into the main battery (such as Hal Jordan and Kilowog) were immune, allowing them to fight back. In retaliation, Henshaw retreats to Earth with the intention to recreate the disaster of destroying Coast City with the power of the Phantom Ring. With the help of other Green Lantern Corpsmen (such as Sodam Yat), Henshaw is defeated and forced to retreat with the Phantom Ring.

Powers and abilities
Hank Henshaw is a "technomorph". Unlike a simple technopath which can physically manipulate technology with their mind, Henshaw can extend his consciousness into any machine.
Through his technomorphic abilities, Henshaw also gained Kryptonian powers similar to Superman, while editing out weaknesses, such as his vulnerability to kryptonite. He could even commandeer complex alien technology, including power rings, controlling and assimilating the energy fueling them, as well as their batteries.

Other versions
 Hank Henshaw appears in the DC/Marvel crossover Green Lantern/Silver Surfer: Unholy Alliances. This version was pulled from the DC Comics universe and brought to the Marvel Comics universe by Thanos, who sought to test a multiversal rift created during Oa's destruction. After destroying a planet due to the tidal stresses generated when he tried to convert it into a new Warworld, Henshaw battles the Silver Surfer until they are interrupted by Hal Jordan / Parallax, who seeks revenge on the former for destroying Coast City.
 Hank Henshaw appears in Superman/Fantastic Four: The Infinite Destruction. He seeks out Galactus in the hopes of becoming one of his heralds and achieving perfection, only to be transformed into a metal rod.
 Hank Henshaw also appears in the Elseworlds story, JLA: Act of God.
 In the crossover story Superman vs. The Terminator: Death to the Future, Henshaw learns of the existence of Skynet in the future and uses a salvaged Terminator skull to provide Skynet with information on Superman's weaknesses, subsequently allying with a T-X unit to eliminate John Connor and the Superman Family. Despite Henshaw merging with the T-X to battle Superman, he is forced to withdraw when Supergirl infects the hybrid with a computer virus developed by Lex Luthor to use against the Terminators that damages the T-X beyond repair.

In other media

Television
 A character resembling Cyborg Superman appears in the Legion of Super Heroes episode "Message in a Bottle", voiced by Yuri Lowenthal. This version is the robot caretaker of the Fortress of Solitude in the 31st century.
 Hank Henshaw appears in Supergirl, portrayed by David Harewood. This version, seeing all aliens as dangerous, founded the Department of Extranormal Operations (DEO) to hunt and kill them. Upon learning of J'onn J'onzz, Henshaw became obsessed with killing him, which led to him killing D.E.O. agent Jeremiah Danvers and falling off a cliff to his apparent death while J'onzz assumed Henshaw's identity throughout season one. In season two, Henshaw resurfaces as the self-proclaimed "Cyborg Superman", having received metallic armor from Project Cadmus and works for Cadmus' leader Lillian Luthor until she is arrested in season three and he is defeated by Alex Danvers.

Film
 Elements of Hank Henshaw are incorporated in a Superman clone who appears in Superman: Doomsday.
 Hank Henshaw appears in The Death and Return of Superman, portrayed by Elijah Wood.
 Hank Henshaw appears in the DC Animated Movie Universe (DCAMU) film The Death of Superman voiced by Patrick Fabian. This version's shuttle was destroyed by Doomsday, after which Henshaw refused to evacuate under the belief that Superman would save him and his crew, leading to their deaths. 
 Hank Henshaw / Cyborg Superman appears in the DCAMU film Reign of the Supermen, voiced by Patrick Fabian and Jerry O’Connell respectively. Prior to the film, Darkseid transferred his consciousness into a cyborg body and brainwashed Henshaw into serving him, indoctrinating him to resent Superman's failure to save the shuttle. Henshaw tricks Metropolis into letting him create a group of cyborgs loyal to him so he can create a Boom Tube and allow Darkseid's forces to invade Earth, but Steel, Superboy, and the Eradicator join forces to revive Superman, who battles Henshaw until he successfully uses a crystal containing the Eradicator's consciousness to destroy Henshaw's.

Video games
 Cyborg Superman appears as a playable character in and the final boss of The Death and Return of Superman.
 Cyborg Superman appears as a boss in Superman: The Man of Steel, voiced by Jeff Kramer.
 Cyborg Superman appears as a downloadable alternate skin for Superman in Injustice: Gods Among Us, voiced by George Newbern.
 Cyborg Superman appears in DC Universe Online via the "War of the Light Part I" DLC.
 Cyborg Superman appears as a playable character in Lego Batman 3: Beyond Gotham, voiced by Travis Willingham.

Miscellaneous
 Hank Henshaw appears in BBC Radio 5's Superman: Doomsday and Beyond, voiced by Kerry Shale.
 Hank Henshaw appears in Smallville Season 11. This version was sent by Lex Luthor to pilot his new anti-alien Guardian Defense Platform, but it causes a radiation leak that nearly kills Henshaw. While Superman successfully rescues the crew, Henshaw pilots the shuttle to safety, suffering third-degree burns and developing locked-in syndrome in the process. Henshaw nearly kills Luthor, but the former's wife Terri convinces him that Superman is to blame and fight him via his new S.T.A.R. Labs-built robot body until Superman tears the robot's head off. Calming down, Henshaw apologizes before his head is placed in S.T.A.R. Labs' secure storage. Over the next few months, he befriends Tess Mercer before breaking out to battle Eclipso while Superman was away in another universe. Once Eclipso is defeated, Henshaw joins forces with Green Lantern to get the former's diamond into deep space.
 Hank Henshaw appears in issue #19 of Batman: The Brave and the Bold.

See also
 List of Superman enemies

References

Cyborg supervillains
DC Comics cyborgs
DC Comics male supervillains
Clone characters in comics
Fictional mass murderers
Fictional technopaths
DC Comics characters who are shapeshifters
DC Comics characters who can move at superhuman speeds
DC Comics characters with accelerated healing
DC Comics characters with superhuman senses
DC Comics characters with superhuman strength
Fictional NASA astronauts
Comics characters introduced in 1990
Characters created by Dan Jurgens
Fictional characters from California
Fictional characters with air or wind abilities
Fictional characters with energy-manipulation abilities
Fictional characters with fire or heat abilities
Fictional characters with ice or cold abilities
Fictional characters with nuclear or radiation abilities
Fictional characters with slowed ageing
Fictional characters with superhuman durability or invulnerability
Fictional characters with X-ray vision
Superman characters
Green Lantern characters